The First President is a 2011 Chinese biographical film directed by Wang Caitao, produced by Han Sanping, and starring Qiu Xinzhi, Nie Mei, Liu Jing, Han Geng, Tian Liang, Johnny Zhang, Xiong Naijin and He Jie. The film is about the life of Sun Yat-sen, founding father of Kuomintang and president of the Republic of China.

Plot
In 1912, Sun Yat-sen was elected provisional president of the Republic of China. Yuan Shikai, a warlord leaded up to the abdication of the last Qing Emperor Puyi, and became president of the Republic of China. At this time, Sun Yat-sen went to Japan. And Song Jiaoren formed the Parliament and pushed the republican system into practice, finally, Song Jiaoren was assassinated. After Sun Yat-sen received the news, he also returned to China and organized the Second Revolution...

Cast

Main
 Qiu Xinzhi as Sun Yat-sen, provisional president of the Republic of China.
 Nie Mei as Song Qingling, wife of Sun Yat-sen.

Supporting
 Liu Jing as Zhou Enlai
 Han Geng as Hu Hanmin, founding member of Kuomintang.
 Johnny Zhang as Chiang Kai-shek
 Xiong Naijin as Soong Ai-ling
 Liu Xiaofeng as Wang Jingwei
 Tiger Hu as Lin Zhimian, democratic revolutionist.
 Li Sheng as Empress Dowager Longyu
 Duan Junhao as Zhu Zhuowen, democratic revolutionist.
 Zhang Qiuge as Yuan Shikai
 Tian Liang as Song Jiaoren
 Yao Jude as Huang Xing
 Zhu Hu as Dai Jitao
 Ju Hao as Zhao Bingjun
 Ling Xiaosu as Li Liejun
 Zhou Yiwei as Chen Jiongming
 He Minghan as Ma Xiang, captain of the guards of Sun Yat-sen.
 Liu Yuqi as Yin Weijun
 Jiang Ping as Li Dazhao
 Cao Bingkun as Yuan Keding, son of Yuan Shikai.
 Xu Zhengting as Song Yaoru
  as Ni Guizhen
 Yu Na as Xu Zonghan
 Wang Yan as He Xiangning
 Tan Yaowen as Duan Qirui
 Bao Jianfeng as Doctor
 Ju Wenpei as Shi Qing, associate editor of Ta Kung Pao.
 Qin Hao as Zhang Ji
 Collin Chou as Chen Qimei
 Zhang Songwen as Ye Ju
 Zhang Yeshi as Yu Youren
 Wang Xiaohu as Tan Renfeng
 Hang Qi as Sun Fo

Release
The film was released on September 30, 2011 in China.

References

External links
 
 

2011 films
2010s Mandarin-language films
Chinese biographical films
Films set in 20th-century Qing dynasty
Cultural depictions of Sun Yat-sen
Cultural depictions of Zhou Enlai
Cultural depictions of Chiang Kai-shek
2010s biographical films